The Huldschinsky Madonna is a c.1410-1430 terracotta sculpture. It is attributed to Donatello, an attribution based on the structure of the drapery, which is no longer simply a means of expression and decoration as in Gothic art but is instead more naturalistic and observed from life, following a strict dialogue with the anatomical forms beneath it and obeying the rules of gravity. The work's attention to detail such as the fringes on the clothing also recalls the artist's other works such as David. It has been in the Bode-Museum in Berlin since being donated by Oscar Huldschinsky in 1892.

References

15th-century sculptures
Sculptures by Donatello
Sculptures of the Berlin State Museums
Terracotta sculptures